is a private junior college in Chūō-ku, Kobe in Hyōgo Prefecture, Japan.  It was established in 1950 and closed in 2020.

History 
The junior college opened in April 1950 for women, but in 2004, it became coeducational, adopting the present name at the same time.

Courses
It offers courses in art, career & communication, and homemaking.

See also 
 List of junior colleges in Japan

Notes

External links 
  

Educational institutions established in 1950
Educational institutions disestablished in 2021
Japanese junior colleges
1950 establishments in Japan
2021 disestablishments in Japan
Universities and colleges in Hyōgo Prefecture
Private universities and colleges in Japan